The High Uptown Historic District, in Columbus, Georgia, is a  historic district which was listed on the National Register of Historic Places in 2004.  The listing included 39 contributing buildings and 18 non-contributing ones.

The district is roughly bounded by 2nd and 3rd Avenues between Railroad and 13th Streets.

The district included 24 properties already listed on the National Register, including:
Peabody-Warner House, NRHP-listed in 1970
Lion House, NRHP-listed in 1972; 
Rankin House (c.1860), NRHP-listed in 1972; 
Illges House (c.1850), NRHP-listed in June 1973; 
Bullard-Hart House, NRHP-listed in July 1977; 
House at 1628 3rd Avenue, (reported to be NRHP-listed in April 1979 but no longer or not ever NRHP-listed, has listing code "DR")
Building at 1400 3rd Avenue, NRHP-listed in September 1980,
Building at 1617 3rd Avenue, NRHP-listed in September 1980, 
Building at 1619 3rd Avenue, NRHP-listed in September 1980,
Building at 1625 3rd Avenue (c.1889), Greek Revival cottage, NRHP-listed in September 1980,
Walter Cargill House, NRHP-listed in September 1980,
Garrett-Bullock House, NRHP-listed in September 1980,
John Paul Illges House, NRHP-listed in September 1980,
Methodist Tabernacle, NRHP-listed in September 1980,
George Phillips House, NRHP-listed in September 1980,
Sixteenth Street School, NRHP-listed in September 1980,
Ernest Woodruff House, NRHP-listed in September 1980,
Henry Lindsay Woodruff Second House, NRHP-listed in September 1980,  
Building at 1531 3rd Avenue, NRHP-listed in December 1980,
Building at 1519 3rd Avenue, NRHP-listed in December 1980,
William L. Cooke House, NRHP-listed in December 1980,
Elisha P. Dismukes House, NRHP-listed in December 1980,
Isaac Maund House, NRHP-listed in December 1980,
Henry Lindsay Woodruff House, NRHP-listed in December 1980.

The oldest buildings are the Illges House (c.1850) and the Rankin House (c.1860).

References

Victorian architecture in Georgia (U.S. state)
Buildings and structures completed in 1838